Ilya Olegovich Korenev (Коренев Илья Олегович ; born February 10, 1995) is a Russian ice hockey player who is currently playing with Lokomotiv Yaroslavl of the Kontinental Hockey League (KHL).

Korenev made his Kontinental Hockey League (KHL) debut playing with Lokomotiv Yaroslavl during the 2013–14 KHL season.

References

External links

1995 births
Living people
Lokomotiv Yaroslavl players
Russian ice hockey forwards
Sportspeople from Khabarovsk